Benjamin Franklin Graves (1771–1813) was a politician and military leader in early 19th-century Kentucky. During the War of 1812, Graves served as a major in the 2nd Battalion, 5th Kentucky Volunteer regiment. Together with other officers, he commanded Kentucky troops in the Battle of Frenchtown (also known as the Battle of the River Raisin) on January 22, 1813, in Michigan Territory. This was part of an effort by Americans to take the British-controlled fort at Detroit, Fort Shelby. This battle had the highest number of American fatalities in the war: of 1,000 American troops, nearly 400 were killed in the conflict, and 547 were taken prisoner. The next day an estimated 30-100 Americans were killed by Native Americans after having surrendered.

Graves was among the Americans known to be taken by the Potawatomi on a forced march to the British fort at Detroit, Michigan. He is believed to have died on the march, as he disappeared from the historic record. Because so many men of the Kentucky elite were lost in the Battle of Frenchtown, it has been commemorated in the state. Graves is included among the officers memorialized on Kentucky's Military Monument to All Wars in the state capital of Frankfort and Kentucky's Graves County was named in his honor.

Personal life and politics
Graves was born in Spotsylvania County, Virginia in 1771. After the American Revolutionary War, he moved in 1791 to frontier Kentucky with his widowed mother and siblings. They settled in Fayette County, where Graves was elected to two terms (1801 and again in 1804) as a state representative. This was in the central Bluegrass region, one of the first areas of the state to be settled by European Americans.

He married Polly Dudley, daughter of Ambrose Dudley and Ann (Parker) Dudley. Together they had six children.

Military career and presumed death 
During the War of 1812, Graves served under Colonel William Lewis as major in the 2nd Battalion, 5th Kentucky Volunteer regiment. He was the commanding officer of Nathaniel G. S. Hart. In the fall of 1812 nearly one thousand Kentucky troops were sent to Michigan Territory in an American effort to take Fort Detroit, which was under the control of the British. On January 18, they defeated British and Native American forces at Frenchtown, south of Detroit. The British forces were led by Colonel Henry Proctor.

At the second Battle of Frenchtown on January 22, 1813, the British and Native Americans ambushed the American troops. During the melee Graves was shot in the knee. He bandaged his wound himself and told his men to continue fighting. After the death of Colonel John Allen, Graves and Major George Madison had to take field command of the Americans. Nearly 400 Americans were killed during the battle, the highest number of fatalities in any single battle of the war, and 547 were taken prisoner at surrender.

Upon General James Winchester's orders, Graves and hundreds of other survivors surrendered to British forces. His younger brother, Lieutenant Thomas Coleman Graves (a 1st Lieutenant of the 17th Infantry), was killed during the battle. After the surrender, British officer Captain William Elliott, a Loyalist, asked to borrow Graves' horse, saddle and bridle. Elliott promised that he would send back additional help for the wounded Americans but the help never arrived.

Proctor moved his forces north in retreat, with a group of the most fit prisoners, in order to evade any American forces arriving from the south. The remaining prisoners were left in Frenchtown. The next day, on January 23, the Potawatomi killed many of the wounded prisoners during what became known as the River Raisin Massacre. Graves, Timothy Mallory, Samuel Ganoe, and John Davenport, were all held as prisoners, with Mallory and Ganoe later escaping. The next day Graves was among the prisoners marched to Detroit despite their wounds, but his name subsequently disappears from written records.

Graves was reportedly seen near Detroit on the River Rouge. But as he was not definitively heard from again, he is presumed to have died during the march. The Potawatomi were known to have killed prisoners who could not keep up on such forced marches. Other Americans also died on the forced march to Fort Malden in Ontario.

General Winchester wrote a February 11, 1813, letter about the battle to the US Secretary of War, which was widely published in American newspapers at that time. He mentioned Major Graves and his fellow officers, saying "they defended themselves to the last with great gallantry". After Graves' disappearance while a prisoner, for years "his widow kept a light burning at the window of their home", in case he would return.

Memorials 

Graves County, Kentucky was created and named in his honor in 1823. Graves' name is inscribed, along with the names of his fellow officers who fell at the Raisin, on Kentucky's Military Monument to All Wars in the Frankfort Cemetery in the state capital. The area of the battlefield was established as River Raisin National Battlefield Park, the only National Battlefield Park to commemorate a battle of the War of 1812.

Notes

References 

1771 births
1813 deaths
Members of the Kentucky House of Representatives
American militiamen in the War of 1812
War of 1812 prisoners of war held by the United Kingdom
People from Spotsylvania County, Virginia
American military personnel killed in the War of 1812